Trash the Planet is the fourth studio album by Australian rock band Spy vs. Spy, produced by Craig Leon (The Ramones, Blondie) and released through WEA in November 1989.

Track listing
All songs written by Craig Bloxom, Michael Weiley, Cliff Grigg and Russell Thomas

Charts

Release history

References

1989 albums
Warner Music Australasia albums
Spy vs Spy (Australian band) albums
Albums produced by Craig Leon